The 1980 Mercedes Cup was a men's tennis tournament played on outdoor clay courts and held at the Tennis Club Weissenhof in Stuttgart, West Germany that was part of the 1980 Grand Prix circuit. It was the third edition of the tournament and was held from 14 July until 20 July 1980. First-seeded Vitas Gerulaitis won the singles title.

Finals

Singles
 Vitas Gerulaitis defeated  Wojciech Fibak, 6–2, 7–5, 6–2
 It was Gerulaitis' second singles title of the year and the 17th of his career.

Doubles
 Frew McMillan /  Colin Dowdeswell defeated  Chris Lewis /  John Yuill, 6–3, 6–4

References

External links
 Official website 
 ATP tournament profile

Stuttgart Open
Stuttgart Open
1980 in German tennis